The Roman Catholic Diocese of Les Gonaïves, erected 3 October 1861, is a suffragan of the Archdiocese of Cap-Haïtien.

Bishops

Ordinaries
Joseph-François-Marie Julliot (1928–1936)
Paul-Sanson-Jean-Marie Robert (1936–1966)
Emmanuel Constant (1966–2003)
Yves-Marie Péan, C.S.C. (2003- )

Coadjutor bishop
Yves-Marie Péan, C.S.C. (2002-2003)

Territorial losses

External links and references

GCatholic.org page for this diocese

Les Gonaives
Les Gonaïves
Les Gonaïves
1861 establishments in Haiti
Roman Catholic Ecclesiastical Province of Cap-Haïtien